The 120 mm Gun Tank T110 was a cancelled heavy tank project which began in June 1954. It was an attempt to improve the T43 heavy tank project. Restrictions were placed on the vehicle sizing as the tank was supposed to pass through the narrow tunnels of the Bernese Alps, none of which actually met the restrictions, but did not enter service due to the redundancy and due to the satisfactory results of the T43(M103) of another heavy tank. It was intended to be built by Chrysler, but no vehicles were ever manufactured.
The tank was planned to be powered by a Continental AVI-1790-8 engine power plant delivering around 875 hp or Continental AOI-1490-1 delivering around 700 hp. The original T110 tank was a proposal created by Detroit Arsenal, and was introduced in a Detroit conference held in June 1954. Of many tank designs, the T110 TS31, was favored.

Proposals
There were four different proposals before the T110 program was canceled, all fitted with either 105mm T210 smoothbore or 120mm T123E1 rifled tank gun. T123E1 later developed into the 120mm M58 used on M103 heavy tank after the T110 program terminated.

TS-31
Accepted T110 proposal, equipped with 120 mm T123E1 rifled gun in a fixed superstructure located at the rear of the hull and powered by Continental AVI-1790-8 engine. Later evolved into T110 design five and T110 design six.

T110 Design Five
This design is the closest one in completion. It was to be armed with 120 mm T123E1 rifled gun in a fixed superstructure located at the center of the hull. Gun traverse was 15 degrees to each side, with 20 degrees of gun elevation and 10 degrees of gun depression. Armor was 5 inches (127 mm) thick sloped at 60 degrees and gun mantlet armor was 9 inches (228.6 mm) thick. One mockup was built.

T110 Design Six
The sixth and final design under the T110 program by Chrysler. It was to be armed with 120 mm T123E1 rifled gun in a rotating turret. Crew was reduced to 4 by removing one loader and the addition of gun rammer. Program was terminated in favor of T43 heavy tank project before a full-sized mockup was built.

TS-2
TS-2 was one of T110 proposal, armed with 105 mm T210 smoothbore gun in a rotating turret and equipped with Continental AOI-1490-1 powerplant. Lost to TS-31.

TS-5
TS-5 was another proposal of T110, armed with 105 mm T210 smoothbore gun in a fixed superstructure and equipped with Continental AOI-1490-1 powerplant. Lost to TS-31.

TS-6
TS-6 was another proposal of T110, armed with 120 mm T123E1 rifled gun in a rotating turret and equipped with Continental AVI-1790-8 powerplant. Lost to TS-31.

In popular culture
Three versions of the T110 tank are represented in the massively multiplayer online game World of Tanks. With one of them (T110E4) is a fictional tank.

References

Cold War tanks of the United States